Oiticicastnia is a genus of moths within the family Castniidae which contains only one species, Oiticicastnia erycina, which is found in Ecuador and French Guiana.

References

Castniidae
Monotypic moth genera
Moths of South America